The Chor Leoni Men's Choir is a male choir based in Vancouver, British Columbia, Canada. The group was founded in 1992 by Order of Canada recipient Diane Loomer, C.M. (1940 - 2012), and consists of up to 65 male singers. While primarily focused on performing classical choral repertoire, Chor Leoni (meaning "choir of lions") sings music of all genres and time periods, and in many different languages. In recent years, the group has commissioned original choral pieces from Ēriks Ešenvalds, Rodney Sharman and others. Since 2013, the group has hosted and participated in the VanMan Choral Summit, a gathering of male choirs from around the world, featuring international choirs such as Chanticleer (ensemble) and Iceland’s Karlakórinn Heimir.

The American choral conductor Erick Lichte (pronounced "light") is the group's artistic director and conductor.

Achievements
1994 - Best Community Choir, CBC/Radio-Canada National Radio Competition for Amateur Choirs
1994 - 1st Prize, Equal Voice (Male), CBC/Radio-Canada National Radio Competition for Amateur Choirs
1996 - 2nd Prize, Equal Voice (Male), CBC/Radio-Canada National Radio Competition for Amateur Choirs
1998 - 2nd Prize, Equal Voice (Male), CBC/Radio-Canada National Radio Competition for Amateur Choirs
2002 - 1st Prize, Equal Voice (Male), CBC/Radio-Canada National Radio Competition for Amateur Choirs
2002 - 1st Prize, Contemporary - CBC/Radio-Canada National Radio Competition for Amateur Choirs
2002 - Best Performance of a Canadian Work - CBC/Radio-Canada National Radio Competition for Amateur Choirs
2003 - 4th Place, European Broadcasting Union's "Let the Peoples Sing" International Choral Competition
2004 - National Choral Award for Outstanding Choral Recording ("Yuletide Fires"), Association of Canadian Choral Conductors
2004 - Western Canadian Music Awards, Outstanding Classical Recording ("Yuletide Fires"), Western Canadian Music Alliance
2006 - 1st Prize, Equal Voice (Male), CBC/Radio-Canada National Radio Competition for Amateur Choirs

Notable performances and tours
1997 - Atlantic Provinces Tour
2000 - Association of Canadian Choral Conductors’ PODIUM 2000
2000 - International Society of Music Educators’ 2000 Convention
2002 - Regional conference of the American Choral Directors Association, Tacoma, WA
2002 - Canadian representative, AmericaFest World Festival of Singing for Boys and Men, Collegeville, MN
2002 - Sixth World Symposium on Choral Music, Minneapolis, MN
2007 - Central Canada Tour, performances and workshops in Montreal, Lachute, Quebec City, Ottawa, Kitchener
2007 - Stratford Summer Music Festival, Stratford, Ontario
2008 - Invited guest choir, NW Division Convention, American Choral Directors' Association, Vancouver, British Columbia, Canada
2008 - Invited guest choir, Western Division Convention, American Choral Directors' Association, Anaheim, CA.
2008 - Host Choir, 2nd International Boys & Men’s Choral Festival, Hradec Králové/Prague, Czech Republic
2009 - Canadian representative and International Guest Choir, 50th National Convention, American Choral Directors' Association, Oklahoma City, Oklahoma

Recordings
Songs of War and Peace - Skylark Records Cat. No. 9501
L'Hymne au Printemps - Out of print.
Canadian Safari - Cypress Choral Recordings Cat. No. CCR0603
Canadian Safari 2 - Cypress Choral Recordings Cat. No. CCR0401
Goin’ Home - Cypress Choral Recordings Cat. No. 0701
Chor Leoni - Cypress Choral Recordings Cat. No. CCR0604
Yuletide Fires - Cypress Choral Recordings Cat. No. CCR0601
Carols & Lullabies: Christmas in the Southwest - Cypress Choral Recordings Cat. No. 0703
Healing Voices - Cypress Choral Recordings Cat. No. 0602
Circle of Compassion - Cypress Choral Recordings Cat. No. 0702
Meetin' Here Tonight - Cypress Choral Recordings Cat. No. 0901

References

Bibliography
Dykk, Lloyd. "A niche choir grows into a tradition," The Vancouver Sun, 5 Nov 2005
Duke, David Gordon. "Choir to perform Whitman set to music," The Vancouver Sun, 9 Nov 2006
Mazey, Steven. "Prize-winning Vancouver men's choir makes Ottawa debut," The Ottawa Citizen, 16 Aug 2007
Ariaratnam, Daniel. "Choir mixes Hockey Night into repertoire: Chor Leoni Men's Choir closes Stratford Summer Music Festival," The Record (Kitchener), 21 Aug 2007
Duke, David Gordon. " Young 'lions' add their voices to choir's tribute. . ." The Vancouver Sun, 8 Nov 2007

External links
 Chor Leoni Men's Choir
 Chor Leoni Men's Choir Profile

Boys' and men's choirs
Canadian choirs
Musical groups from Vancouver
Musical groups established in 1992
1992 establishments in British Columbia